Joachim Sterck van Ringelbergh (Joachimus Fortius Ringelbergius) (Antwerp, c. 1499 – c. 1531) was a Flemish scholar, humanist, mathematician and astrologer.

His Lucubrationes vel potius absolutissima kyklopaideia (Basileae: Westheimer, 1538) was the first work to use a version of the word "cyclopaedia" in its title.

He is known also for his book on pedagogy, De Ratione Studii.

References

External links

Biography (Dutch language)
Biography and Bibliography

Flemish encyclopedists
Flemish Renaissance humanists
16th-century encyclopedias
16th-century mathematicians
1490s births
1530s deaths